John Tigard House is a home built in 1880 located in Tigard, Oregon. The home was originally owned by John Tigard, the son of Tigard founder, Wilson Tigard. Queen Anne in style, the structure was moved from its original location along Oregon Route 99W in 1978. Now a museum, it was added to the National Register of Historic Places in 1979.

History
In 1852, Wilson Tigard arrived over the Oregon Trail and settled in the southeast part of Washington County, Oregon, where he became the namesake to what was originally called Tigardville, and later shortened to Tigard. Tigard's oldest son John built a house in 1880 on a plot of land that is now at the intersection of Gaarde Street and Oregon Route 99W in Tigard. After a time the structure began to deteriorate and became rundown by the 1970s.

In the 1970s a group of residents formed the Tigard Historical Association to prevent the house from being torn down. They moved the house in 1978 to its present location on Canterbury Lane at 103rd, east of the original location. The group then restored the home. In April 1979, the state's committee on historic preservation recommended the property be listed on the National Register of Historic Places, with the home added to the register on July 20, 1979, as the John Tigard House. The home has been used to host a variety of events, including an apple harvest festival in September 2007.

Details

The -story wood building is in the Queen Anne style of architecture with some Carpenter Gothic elements. The home has three bedrooms and is now a museum for the Tigard Historical Society. The half story is an attic, which is used for storing artifacts of the historical society. Outside, the yard includes an apple orchard. Each year during December the home is decorated for Christmas. The free museum has an open house each month.

References

Further reading
Wiederhold, K. M. (2000). Exploring Oregon's Historic House Museums. Corvallis: Oregon State University Press.

External links
The John Tigard House Museum
Tigard notes: A look inside Tigard's historic John Tigard House - The Oregonian

Houses completed in 1880
Houses on the National Register of Historic Places in Oregon
National Register of Historic Places in Washington County, Oregon
Tigard, Oregon
Historic house museums in Oregon
Museums in Washington County, Oregon
1880 establishments in Oregon
Houses in Washington County, Oregon